Vladimir Aleksandrovich Demidov (born 19 January 1964) is a former Russian professional footballer.

Club career
He made his professional debut in the Soviet Top League in 1984 for FC Dynamo Moscow. He played 1 game in the UEFA Cup 1987–88 for FC Dynamo Moscow.

Honours
 Soviet Top League runner-up: 1986.
 Soviet Cup winner: 1984.

References

1964 births
Footballers from Moscow
Living people
Soviet footballers
Association football defenders
Russian footballers
Russian expatriate footballers
Soviet Top League players
FC Dynamo Moscow players
FC Dinamo Minsk players
Expatriate footballers in Sweden
Vladimir